Belding Area Schools is a school district headquartered in Belding, Michigan.

Previously the district used the "Redskins" as the mascot. Wes Cummings, who served as the athletic director at Belding, stated that Belding's athletic rivals often made derogatory references to killing Native Americans during sports games. In December 2016 the school board voted to remove the "Redskins" as the school district mascot.  the district has since decided to change the name and mascot to the Black Knight.

Administration 

 Superintendent : Brent Noskey 
 High School Principal: Michael Ostrander 
 Middle School Principal: Joe Barron
 Woodview Elementary Principal: Bruce Cook
 Ellis Elementary Principal: Brian Babbitt
***As of July, 7th 2022
 School HR : Renee Gillespie

Schools
 Belding High School (9–12)
 Belding Middle School (6–8)
 Woodview Elementary School (3–6)
 Ellis Elementary (K–2)

References

External links
 Belding Area Schools

School districts in Michigan
Education in Ionia County, Michigan